Duvvuri Subbarao (born 11 August 1949) is an Indian economist, Central Banker, and retired IAS officer. He was the 22nd Governor of Reserve Bank of India, served under Prime Minister Dr. Manmohan Singh. After stepping down from RBI, he was a Distinguished Visiting Fellow first at the National University of Singapore and later at the University of Pennsylvania.

Subbarao is a 1972 batch Indian Administrative Service (IAS) officer of the Andhra Pradesh cadre. He was appointed the 22nd Governor of Reserve Bank of India (RBI) and served from 5 September 2008, with an extension in 2011 till 4 September 2013.

Early life 
Subbarao hails from Eluru in West Godavari district of Andhra Pradesh. He did his schooling in Sainik School, Korukonda, Andhra Pradesh (1962–65). Later he did BSc Hons in Physics at the Institute of Technology Kharagpur (1966–69) graduating at the top of his class, and MSc at the Indian Institute of Technology Kanpur . Subbarao topped the Civil Services Examination in 1972 and was assigned to the Andhra Pradesh cadre of the IAS.

During 1977-78, Subbarao took study leave to do a Masters in Economics at the Ohio State University, United States. During 1982-83, he was a Humphrey Fellow at MIT where he studied Public Finance. In 1988, he earned a Ph.D. in Economics from Andhra University. for his doctoral thesis "Fiscal reforms at the sub-national level"

Career 
Subbarao's early career consisted of field postings in Andhra Pradesh. As Collector of Khammam District of Andhra Pradesh (1979), he earned a formidable reputation for diligently and systematically implementing the land transfer regulation which involved in the main restoring land that tribal households had lost due to indebtedness back to them as laid down in the protective legislation. As Managing Director of Andhra Pradesh State Finance Corporation (1986–88), he was noted for encouraging first generation entrepreneurs to invest in industry and service sectors.

Subbarao was on deputation to Government of India as a joint secretary in the Department of Economic Affairs, Ministry of Finance, where he was involved in formulating and implementing the 1991 reforms. Subsequently, he was the Finance Secretary to the Government of Andhra Pradesh (1993–98), where he is credited with having led a range of pathbreaking fiscal reforms. He was the principal force behind the decision of the state government to publish a white paper (1996) on state finances which went a long way to get popular support for politically difficult economic reforms.

He worked as a lead economist in the World Bank (1999-2004) where his work involved encouraging public expenditure reforms in developing countries. He also task managed the World Bank's flagship study on decentralization in East Asia.

On return to India from the World Bank, he was appointed to the Prime Ministers’ Economic Advisory Council (2005–07) before he was elevated as the Finance Secretary in 2007. On 5 September 2008, he was appointed Governor of Reserve Bank of India (RBI) becoming the first serving civil servant and the first born after Independence to be appointed as central bank Governor while Arun Ramanathan was appointed as Finance Secretary on 21 September 2008 in his vacancy. Subbarao's term was extended for two more years in 2011.

Achievements 
As Finance Secretary to Government of India, Subbarao questioned the rationale of giving away valuable spectrum to telecom operators in 2007 at prices fixed in 2001. He argued that there must be fresh bidding to discover the current price. Subbarao gave evidence in the CBI case relating to alleged corruption by ministers and civil servants in the allocation of 2G spectrum and the judge noted in the judgement that he was a stellar witness.

Subbarao's term as Governor of RBI was by all accounts an unusually turbulent period for the world and for India. The global financial crisis erupted within a week of his assuming office. Then just as the impact of the crisis on India started ebbing, the action shifted to combating an unusually stubborn bout of inflation (2009–11) which segued into a battle against a sharp depreciation of rupee because of what came to be known as taper tantrums. Subbarao is generally credited as having safely stewarded Indian economy through the financial crisis although he has been criticized for not aggressively stemming the fall of the rupee during the taper tantrums.

Subbarao's tenure as Governor of RBI will be most remembered for the way he boldly stood up for the autonomy of the central bank. His term will also be noted for his initiatives to demysttify central bank, for opening up communication channels with stakeholders and for outreach to the larger public. He was instrumental in ensuring 100% meaningful financial inclusion in Ernakulam district of Kerala. Subbarao is credited with the theory of the New Trilemma of central bankers, which he called the "Holy Trinity" of price stability, financial stability and sovereign debt sustainability as against Mundell's well known "impossible trinity" of a fixed exchange rate, free capital flows and independent monetary policy. Subbarao's erudite exposition of the holy trinity firmly established the Indian perspective in the scholastic debate on the global central banking trilemma.

Controversies 
Subbarao is known to have a mind of his own and is known to have frequently overridden the advice of his fellow members in the Technical Advisory Group on Monetary Policy (TAG). To his credit, he explained why he had to go against the views of the TAG in his book.

Personal life 
He is married to Urmila Subbarao.  They have two sons, Mallik and Raghav, who are both IIT graduates like their father.

Selected works
Subbarao's book, "Who Moved My Interest Rate?: Leading the Reserve Bank of India Through Five Turbulent Years", was published in July 2016. The book has been hailed for the honesty, humility and candour with which Subbarao narrated the challenges and dilemmas he confronted as Governor of RBI during an unusually turbulent period.

Subbarao now writes frequently in national and international media on issues of current macroeconomic interest. His columns are noted for his forthright views and lucid explanation of complex issues.

References 

1948 births
Indian Administrative Service officers
Living people
Governors of the Reserve Bank of India
Sainik School alumni
IIT Kanpur alumni
IIT Kharagpur alumni
Andhra University alumni
Ohio State University Graduate School alumni
People from Eluru
Businesspeople from Andhra Pradesh
Scientists from Andhra Pradesh
20th-century Indian economists
21st-century Indian economists
Reserve Bank of India